Lawrence James Travagliante—better known by his on-air moniker Kid Leo—serves as both General Manager and afternoon disc jockey on Little Steven's Underground Garage on Sirius XM Radio (channel 21).  He  first began in radio in 1973 at noted Cleveland rock station WMMS (100.7 FM, "The Buzzard"). During his 16-year tenure, WMMS was consistently one of the highest-rated radio stations in the country.  In 1988 he left to work as an executive at Columbia Records, where he served until 2002.  Since 2004, Travagliante has been involved with Underground Garage.  He also currently operates his own consultancy, LJT Entertainment.

WMMS
Kid Leo started at WMMS in February, 1973. He became the afternoon drive DJ in 1974, holding that time slot until he left the station in December, 1988.  In 1977 he was promoted to Music Director, then assumed the Operations Manager position in 1986. “To many, Kid Leo was WMMS.  For sixteen years he was the pulse of the station, pumping music and life into the veins of listeners.”    He was known for embracing new acts, and was credited with breaking many artists in the Cleveland market and giving them more advantage with greater national exposure.  Some of those artists were Bruce Springsteen, John Mellencamp, Pat Benatar, Roxy Music, Cyndi Lauper, The Pretenders, New York Dolls, and Southside Johnny.   
Kid Leo played a biographical role in the video of "Make Me Lose Control," a 1988 Billboard Hot 100 No. 3 super-smash hit single by Eric Carmen.

While at WMMS, Kid Leo became involved in the campaign to bring the Rock and Roll Hall of Fame to Cleveland.  For his efforts in helping secure the Rock Hall, former Cleveland mayor and then-Ohio governor George Voinovich presented him with the key to the city in 1990.  His on-air work is represented as part of the permanent radio exhibit in the Rock and Roll Hall of Fame.
	
Kid Leo received many industry awards while in radio, and in 1980 was named one of the “Heavy Hundred: The High and Mighty of the Music Industry” in Rolling Stone magazine.  He was also named Best Disc Jockey by Playboy magazine in their January, 1987 issue.  His radio gravitas was also referenced in the director's cut of Cameron Crowe's 2000 motion picture Almost Famous.   In 2003 he was inducted into the Radio and Television Broadcasters' Hall of Fame of Ohio.  In 2013 CNN named Kid Leo one of the ten All-Time Great DJs.

Columbia Records
Kid Leo joined Columbia Records in 1989 as Vice President of Artist Development.   His first responsibilities were to oversee the Alternative, Jazz, Metal and Dance departments, and strengthen their presence within the company.    He was named the label liaison for The Rolling Stones' “Steel Wheels” tour and collaborated with the band and their management on behalf of Columbia's interests.  He instituted the first promotion department at a major label that was solely dedicated to the Adult Album Alternative (AAA) format.  Kid Leo was directly involved with the campaigns that broke Alice In Chains, Shawn Colvin and Train. In 2002, he left Columbia Records but continued on as a consultant through 2004.

LJT Entertainment
In 2002, Kid Leo formed LJT Entertainment LLC.  The company is a music- and media-focused consultancy whose clients have included Columbia Records, the Rock and Roll Hall of Fame, and Renegade Nation.  LJT Entertainment's offices are located in Southport, North Carolina.

Underground Garage
Since 2004 Kid Leo has been Program Director for Little Steven's Underground Garage, a channel on Sirius XM Radio that was developed by Little Steven Van Zandt.  In 2021 he was promoted to General Manager.  He worked closely with Van Zandt in applying 24/7 format rules to the concepts that Little Steven uses on his own terrestrial-radio syndicated program.  Kid Leo is also on the air in the Underground Garage (Sirius XM channel 21).  His show airs Wednesday through Friday from 4 p.m. ET until 7 p.m. ET.  As General Manager he guides an on-air staff that includes Michael Des Barres, Lenny Kaye, Slim Jim Phantom and Drew Carey..

Personal life
Kid Leo sat on the Board of Directors of the T.J. Martell Foundation for 35 years.  It is a music industry-based charity which raises funds for research in the areas of cancer, leukemia and AIDS. In 2022, he was honored by Cleveland State University when CSU's President and Board of Trustees conferred him with the degree of Doctor of Humane Letters, Honoris Causa.

References

External links
Sirius XM: Underground Garage
Renegade Nation
The T.J. Martell Foundation - New York
Radio Television Broadcasters' Hall of Fame of Ohio inductee page
Rock Hall WMMS exhibit

1950 births
Living people
American radio DJs
American music industry executives
Radio personalities from Cleveland
Cleveland State University alumni